Pratchaya Tepparak (born 1 September 1993) is a Thai athlete specialising in the triple jump. He won a silver medal at the 2017 Asian Indoor and Martial Arts Games.

His personal bests in the event are 16.43 metres outdoors (0.0 m/s, Jakarta 2018) and 16.12 metres indoors (Ashgabat 2017). The latter is the current national record.

Competition record

References

1993 births
Living people
Pratchaya Tepparak
Athletes (track and field) at the 2014 Asian Games
Athletes (track and field) at the 2018 Asian Games
Pratchaya Tepparak
Pratchaya Tepparak